The Corbet's forest shrew (Sylvisorex corbeti) is a species of mammal in the family Soricidae. It is found in the Nigeria and Cameroon.

References

Sylvisorex
Mammals described in 2009